Sligo, a town in the north-west of Ireland and county town of County Sligo, has produced noted artists, authors, entertainers, politicians and business-people.

Music 

Perry Blake, singer and songwriter
Tabby Callaghan, musician, The X Factor finalist
Michael Coleman, musician
Thomas Connellan, harper/composer
William Connellan, harper/composer
Kian Egan, member of Westlife
Mark Feehily, member of Westlife
Shane Filan, member of Westlife
Tommy Fleming, singer
Carmel Gunning, traditional Irish musician and singer
Paddy Killoran, musician
Naisse Mac Cithruadh, musician
Maisie McDaniel, Irish country and showband singer
James Morrison, musician
Seamie O'Dowd, multi-instrumentalist and former member of Dervish
Mary O'Hara, singer and harpist
Lisa Stanley, Irish country singer/songwriter and daughter of Maisie McDaniel

Arts and literature 

Leland Bardwell, poet, novelist and playwright
Mary Colum, literary critic and author
Owen Connellan, scholar, RIA
Thady Connellan, scholar, published Irish-English dictionary 1814
Neil Jordan, filmmaker and novelist; won an Academy Award for Best Original Screenplay for The Crying Game
Brian Leyden, short story writer and novelist
Dubhaltach Mac Fhirbhisigh, Irish scribe, author of the Great Book of Irish Genealogies
Giolla Íosa Mór Mac Fir Bhisigh, historian, scribe compiler of the Yellow Book of Lecan, Great Book of Lecan
Joe McGowan, author and historian
Muireadhach Albanach Ó Dálaigh, Ollamh of poetry at Lissadell and crusader
Tadhg Dall Ó hUiginn, file/poet, author of many poems in classical Dán Díreach style
Jack Butler Yeats, painter and cartoonist
William Butler Yeats, poet

Historical and political figures 

St. Attracta of Killaraght, Irish ecclesiastic, 5th century, Saint
Declan Bree, politician and social campaigner, former Labour TD for Sligo/Leitrim
John J. Burns, mayor of Burlington, Vermont
Frank Carty, Sligo IRA leader during the War of Independence and Irish Civil War; elected a TD for Sinn Féin and Fianna Fáil
William Bourke Cockran, U.S. congressman
Brigadier General Michael Corcoran, Union army general, American civil war
Luke Duffy, trade unionist and politician
Féchín of Fore, Irish ecclesiastic
Michael Fenton, first Speaker of the Tasmanian House of Assembly.
Patrick J. Hamrock, Colorado National Guardsman, participant in Sioux Wars and Ludlow Massacre
John Jinks, politician
Tuathal Mac Cormac Maelgarbh ua Cairbre, King of Ireland?, conqueror of Brega
Chris MacManus, Sinn Féin MEP for Midlands–North-West Constituency
Seán MacManus, former Sinn Féin Mayor of Sligo
Cairbre Mac Néill, Irish king and warrior, son of Niall of the Nine Hostages
Ray MacSharry, former government minister and EU Commissioner
Linda Kearns MacWhinney Nurse, revolutionary and Fianna Fáil politician
Constance Markievicz (née Gore-Booth), revolutionary; first elected female MP in the UK Parliament; first Irish female cabinet minister
Alexander McCabe, revolutionary and Sinn Féin TD, later a member of Cumann na nGaedheal
Martin Moffat, soldier, recipient of the Victoria Cross
Nath í of Achad an Rí, 6th century Irish ecclesiastic
Fearghal Ó Gadhra, Chief of Coolavin, patron of the Annals of the Four Masters
Ambrosio O'Higgins, 1st Marquess of Osorno, Governor of Chile and Viceroy of Peru during the Spanish domination of the Americas
Bernardo O'Higgins, Liberator of Chile
William Partridge, trade unionist, revolutionary, leader of Irish Citizen Army, fought during Easter Rising
Liam Pilkington, IRA commander, 3rd western division, 1921-23. Anti-treaty IRA
Martin Savage, Irish Republican
Brian Luighnech Ua Conchobhair, King of Cairbre Drom Cliabh, ancestor of the Ó Conchobar Sligigh, son of Toirdealbhach Mór Ó Conchobar, High King of Ireland 1106-1156

Medicine and science

William Cunningham Blest, creator of the first Chilean School of Medicine
Sir George Stokes, 1st Baronet, mathematician and physicist

Sports 

Jonathan Dolan, Irish badminton player
Sean Fallon, former Republic of Ireland and Celtic F.C. footballer
Mickey Kearins GAA
Paul McGee, Sligo Rovers F.C. and Ireland international soccer player
Mona McSharry swimmer
Barnes Murphy GAA
Christopher O'Donnell, Ireland International track and field sprinter
Eamonn O'Hara GAA
Mark Scanlon, cyclist
Brother Walfrid (aka Andrew Kerins), Marist Brother, and founder of Celtic F.C. in Glasgow

Film and entertainment 

Pauline Flanagan, film and television actress
Scott Fredericks, film and television actor, radio producer
Neil Jordan, director of The Crying Game, Interview with the Vampire, Michael Collins
Eugene Lambert, puppeteer and children's entertainer
Pauline McLynn, actress, Mrs Doyle in the sitcom Father Ted
Noelle Middleton, film and television actress
Lola Montez, actress, exotic dancer, courtesan and the mistress of King Ludwig I of Bavaria
Joan O'Hara, film and television actress
Dearbhla Walsh, film and TV director
Olga Wehrly, actor

Business 

Niall FitzGerald, Chairman of Reuters Group plc; former Chairman and CEO of Unilever plc
Dermot Mannion, CEO of Aer Lingus

See also
 :Category:People from County Sligo

References

Sligo
 
People